Mexicoscylus rosae is a species of beetle in the family Cerambycidae. It was described by Martins and Galileo in 2011. It is known from Mexico.

References

Hemilophini
Beetles described in 2011